The Sareqaum family are a Bengali Muslim family of the Sylhet Division of Bangladesh. They are best known for their centuries-old role as one of the custodian families of the waqf (estate) of Shah Jalal, a 14th-century Islamic preacher whose name is commonly associated with the spread of Islam in the region. The family is the only known family in Bengal to hold the title of Sar-e-Qaum (head of the people). Some members of the family have migrated to other parts of the world such as to the United Kingdom - which is known to host a large Bangladeshi diaspora.

Origin
Following the Conquest of Sylhet in 1303, Shah Jalal ordered most of his companions, traditionally thought to have numbered above 300, to disperse to and settle in different part of Bengal and eastern India and propagate Islam in those places. Haji Yusuf was one of the companions who remained in the neighbourhood of Chowkidighi alongside Shah Jalal. At Jalal's instruction, Yusuf married a native woman who had become a Muslim. Before dying on 15 March 1346, Jalal appointed Yusuf to be the mutawalli (custodian) of his waqf (estate).

It is assumed that after Shah Jalal's death in 1346, he was buried and a tomb complex was built in his waqf estate - which was now in the control of Yusuf. Following Yusuf's own death, he was also buried within the waqf - Yusuf's tomb being located southeast of Jalal's tomb. He was succeeded by Khwaja Fayzullah, Manik Nizam Uddin, Shaykh Muhammad and Malik Ahmad respectively. Malik Ahmad would be succeeded by Pir Bakhsh.

Title obtainal
In the 17th century, Sylhet came under the control of the Mughal Empire. The Faujdar (governor) of Sylhet, Isfandiyar Khan Beg, was known to have officially recognised the inauguration of Shaykh Pir Bakhsh as the rightful custodian of the waqf in the 1660s. Pir Bakhsh was given the title of Sar-e-Qaum (head of the people) and his descendants, the Sareqaum family, continue to hold this role. Khan also built a mosque near the dargah and the ruins of this incomplete mosque can be seen today, behind the trees near the Dargah Gateway.

During this Mughal period, a house was constructed to serve as a majlis (lounge) and it was known as the Jolsha Ghor. To the west of this house remains the graves of two custodians; Sareqaum Abu Nasr and Sareqaum Abu Nasir.

During British rule

Sareqaum Abu Torab Abdul Waheb was the head of the family in the late 1800s and was also buried next to Shah Jalal. He was succeeded by Sareqaum Abu Sayad Abd al-Hafiz and then Sareqaum Abu Zafar Abdullah.

On 16 September 1936, Bengali Muslim litterateurs, gathered at the Sareqaum House where they established the well-known literary society known as the Sylhet Central Muslim Literary Society (later branching out to become the Kendriya Muslim Sahitya Sangsad). One of the oldest literary societies in Bangladesh, its inaugural secretary was Sareqaum Abu Zafar Abdullah, a well-known Bengali writer and the Mutawalli of Shah Jalal's dargah. Other members of this society included Muhammad Nurul Haque and Syed Abdul Majid. Many of Abdullah's works were published in the popular newspapers of those times. His most famous work was Shaptak. The Sangsad as well its Al-Islah magazine were based in Abdullah's property. He was key activist during the Pakistan Movement. Abdullah's maternal cousin was the historian Nasiruddin Ahmad Chowdhury. In 1971, Abdullah started the construction of a minaret (with a clock) in the dargah complex which was completed a few days after the Independence of Bangladesh.

Moulvi Sareqaum Ubaydullah was a poet who famously wrote the Rakhaliya Bashi. From 1942, he was a member of the Sangsad. He hosted Kazi Nazrul Islam during the his visit to the Sylhet region.

Post-independence period
The Mutawalli Sareqaum Yusuf Amanullah, son of Abu Zafar Abdullah, was Abdullah's successor and the vice-president of the Sangsad from 1988 to 1990. In 1996, Sareqaum Ikramullah was a sponsor of the Sangsad. Amanullah died in 2013 at the age of 76 years due to illness. He had one son and four daughters, and the Prime Minister of Bangladesh Sheikh Hasina paid her respects. In the same year, the Khadim Sareqaum Yunus Ayatullah died. Sareqaum Khaled Ahmed was a director for the British Bangladesh Chamber of Commerce.

Yusuf Amanullah's successor was his son, Sareqaum Fatehullah Al-Aman. During Aman's time as Sareqaum, he was the first known custodian to have cancelled the centuries-old annual urs ceremony held at the Dargah as a result of the COVID-19 pandemic.

See also
 History of Sylhet

Further reading

References

Asian noble families
Bangladeshi families
Muslim families
Bengali families
People from Sylhet
Bangladeshi people of Arab descent